Mike Gaston (created 1949) is a broadcast journalist, peace builder and  singer/songwriter living in Northern Ireland.

Peace building 

Gaston first became involved in peace building in October 1968, when Ray Davey introduced him to the Corrymeela Community. Along with dozens of other student volunteers, he worked for the community over the next four years. Physically, through summer work camps and developmentally, through community action programmes, fundraising and conference organisation. Over the next decade, Mike practiced as a qualified social worker and community development professional in Craigavon and Belfast. He subsequently became Northern Ireland Regional Manager for Community Service Volunteers (CSV). Whilst with CSV, he was instrumental in rolling out Community Action Radio and Television on Ulster Television, BBC Radio Ulster and Downtown Radio. He returned full circle to peace building in 2002. Since then he has worked as an independent mediator, peace builder and trainer for several organisations including Mediation Northern Ireland, WEA Northern Ireland, the Northern Ireland Housing Executive and Lakou Lape (Haiti).

Broadcasting 

Gaston was seconded, by BBC Northern Ireland to research the need for Youth Programmes in January 1980. This work and the subsequent report  led to the creation of the Youth Programmes Unit by BBC Northern Ireland. Mike was then recruited by BBC NI, News and Current Affairs. He worked as a producer and reporter on P.M. Ulster, Sunday Sequence, Good Morning Ulster and Newsbreak. During this period, he covered major stories including the Darkley Massacre, November 1983,the Milltown Cemetery attack, March 1988 and the Enniskillen Remembrance Day bombing, November 1987. He was the first reporter to interview Gordon Wilson. The resulting interview was instrumental in persuading Loyalist paramilitaries not to carry out acts of retaliation. International Mediator, William Ury later noted "No words in more than twenty-five years of violence in Northern Ireland had such a powerful, emotional impact." Gaston was nominated Sony Radio reporter of the year for his coverage of the Enniskillen story.

He also produced and presented a number of documentaries for the BBC including, Holding Out on the Border, Paddling Round Cape Horn, Christian Rock OK and Running Away with the Circus. During this period, as well as working at the BBC, Gaston was Northern Ireland correspondent for Associated Press Radio Network  and Macquarie Radio Network(Australia). He was also a correspondent for Carsport magazine.

In January, 1990, Gaston took up appointment as Head of Programmes for the newly founded Belfast Community Radio Three months later, on 6 April, 60 brand new broadcasters had been recruited, trained, scheduled, rehearsed and were on the air.

Less than six weeks later, the station almost closed down as staff threatened to walk out in protest at the sacking of their Head of Programmes by the company CEO. In an emergency meeting that night, Gaston persuaded the staff not to strike so that they could continue to fulfill their lifetime ambitions. He was subsequently awarded 10% of the company's equity in part settlement following negotiations at the LRA, where the company also rescinded its termination notice  The radio station CEO was censured by the board and subsequently resigned.

Gaston was employed almost immediately by Wear FM, Sunderland to become its founding News Editor / Deputy Station Manager. Thus becoming one of the few people to launch two brand new radio stations in less than a year. Wear FM launched on 5 November 1990, with a range of popular programmes including Boogie Bass and Soulfish, Yer Ganny's Boot and Gay to Gay. Gaston also pioneered the first NJC course in applied broadcast journalism in conjunction with Sunderland University. Wear FM won the Sony Gold Radio Station award for its first year's output.

In March 1992, Gaston was invited, by the board of Belfast Community Radio (BCR) to return to rescue the station, which by then had gotten into serious financial difficulty.  Using the equity that he had been awarded by the station's Chief Executive just eighteen months previously, he took control, reversed the crisis and led the station to its first period of economic stability. Gaston has since enabled the financial recovery of several other companies and voluntary organisations.

Towards the end of 1995, it became increasingly apparent that BCR could not survive in the long term as a pure community radio station. Consequently, with the support of the board of directors, the Radio Authority and the majority of the staff, Gaston rebranded the station as Belfast CityBeat and organised the transfer of the majority of its ownership to Transworld Communications.

He became a talk show producer and presenter with Belfast 89 in April 2015. He currently produces and presents the Tuesday Talk In  on the station.

Music 
 

In the mid 70s Mike, a self-taught guitarist and singer, began performing in folk clubs in Belfast and Dublin. His first self penned song, Amber, was recorded by the Hammond Family on HMV in New Zealand in 1974 and became a top ten hit there.
He shared the stage at the Belfast Festival at Queens in 1975 with Scottish National poet, Liz Lochhead as a last minute stand-in for a Scots folk group which had been stranded in Stornaway.

Singing a variety of his own songs, Mike was a runner up in the Northern Ireland Benson and Hedges Entertainer of the Year Competition in 1978.

He was Stage Manager for the Belfast International Folk Festival from 1980 - 1983, working with artists like Ralph McTell, Loudon Wainwright III, DeDannan and Maura O’Connell.

As a member of St Patrick's Choral Society in Downpatrick, he played the Kralahome in The King and I in 2002, was the producer for Carousel in 2003 and played Fagan in Oliver Twist in 2004.
Gaston opened for Dougie Maclean at the Belfast Nashville Songwriter's Festival in 2008 and played Customs House Square, Belfast at the Tall Ships Race in 2009 with his folk group Chanter. They also played at the Ulster Scots Folk Festival in 2009 and 2010. Chanter played a full set of Mike's own songs at the Lagan Sessions in Belfast in October 2012 which was recorded for CD and DvD.

Gaston has been a concert manager and compere for the Belfast Nashville Songwriter's Festival since 2008, working with songwriters like Nanci Griffith, Eleanor McEvoy, Ralph McTell and Billy Bragg.

Playwright and historian, Philip Orr invited Gaston to collaborate on a project which illustrated the humanitarian, egalitarian and peace building spirit inherent in the works of the Scottish Bard, Rabbie Burns. They performed this at the Skainos Centre in East Belfast and also the West Belfast Festival, Féile an Phobail in 2013.

In January 2015, Mike became one of the organisers of The Hair O'The Dog Sessions, a series of cross community traditional music sessions in Molly Browns, Newtownards, Saltwater Brig, Portaferry and Horatio Todd's, Belfast. The sessions were accessible to musicians at all levels of ability and from all community backgrounds.

The sessions were superseded by the creation of Hair O'The Dog Group in January 2017. Hair O'The Dog plays accessible Irish, Scots and American folk in a number of venues including Horatio Todds and The Playwright.

Heritage 

Following the transfer of BCR to Transworld Communications, Gaston became the first Property Manager at Castle Ward for the National Trust. He was responsible for the built, man made and natural heritage of the estate, as well as for its business development. In this latter role, he organized the first modern day Viking invasion of Strangford Lough and the first  commercial weddings on the site He also co-ordinated using Castle Ward as a location  for the filming of Hollywood movie, St Ives later retitled All for Love, starring Anna Friel, the location filming of a The Hole in the Wall Gang special and five years co-operation with Castleward Opera.

Motorsport 

Between 1986 and 1996, Gaston took up competitive motor sport as a special stage rally co driver. Notable achievements in rallying included: 2nd in class and 4th overall in the Irish National Rally Championship (1986) with driver Kerron Humphreys  and winning the Irish Forest Rally Championship with driver Roy Haslett (1996). The 1995 victory was against the odds, since the car was a fairly aged, rear wheel drive G3 Escort, which faced stiff competition from several state of the art four wheel drive Escort Cosworths.
Gaston has been a correspondent with Carsport Magazine (including the Give it a Spin series), Stars and Cars, and Buying Secondhand.

References

External links
Mike Gaston with Chanter

1949 births
Living people
Queen's University at Kingston alumni
Alumni of the University of Edinburgh
Radio DJs from Northern Ireland
Guitarists from Northern Ireland
Male singers from Northern Ireland